Jordyn Bahl (born July 24, 2002) is an American college softball pitcher for the Oklahoma Sooners. As a freshman in 2022, she was named NFCA National Freshman of the Year.

High school career
Bahl attended Papillion-La Vista Senior High School in Papillion, Nebraska. She led the Monarchs to three consecutive Class A state titles and was awarded All-State honors all four years. During her junior year in 2020, she posted a 27–0 record with a 0.15 ERA, surrendering just 27 hits and 24 walks in 139 innings pitched, while striking out 299 batters. She also batted .581 with 59 RBI, tying the Class A single-season record with 22 home runs. Following an outstanding season, she was named the Nebraska Softball Player of the Year.

During her senior year in 2021, she posted a 27–0 record with a 0.10 ERA, surrendering just 27 hits and 15 walks in 137 innings pitched, while striking out 316 batters. She also batted .510 with 20 home runs and 55 RBI. Following an outstanding season she was named Nebraska Softball Player of the Year for the second consecutive year and Gatorade National Softball Player of the Year.

She finished her career at Papillion with a 95–3 record, 0.63 ERA, and 978 strikeouts, in 523 innings. She also recorded 63 complete games and one perfect game. Bahl was ranked as the nation's No. 1 recruit in the Class of 2021 by Softball America and Extra Inning Softball.

College career
Bahl made her collegiate debut for Oklahoma on February 10, 2022, in a game against UC Santa Barbara. She struck out four of the eight batters she faced in  innings. Sophomore Nicole May and graduate transfer Hope Trautwein combined to finish the perfect game for the Sooners. On February 25, she pitched a perfect game against Cal State Fullerton. She struck out 11 in the complete-game performance, allowing no hits or walks to the 18 batters she faced. She became the first Oklahoma freshman to pitch a perfect game since Paige Parker in 2015. She finished the regular season with a 21–1 record, with a 0.95 ERA, 199 strikeouts and 29 walks in  innings pitched. She allowed 18 earned runs, while holding opponents to a .137 batting average including seven shutouts.

On May 6, 2022, she suffered an injury during a pregame warm-up for the Saturday game in the regular series finale against Oklahoma State. She didn't pitch during the 2022 Big 12 Conference softball tournament due to suffering arm soreness. She pitched for the first time since returning from injury on June 2, during the first game of the 2022 Women's College World Series against Northwestern. She threw 11 pitches, and allowed two hits while recording just one out. During the Women's College World Series championship game on June 9, she allowed four hits, two runs, three walks and two strikeouts in four innings and earned the win in the title clinching game. Following an outstanding season, she was named Big 12 Freshman of the Year and Co-Big 12 Pitcher of the Year and a unanimous first-team All-Big 12 selection. She was also named a first-team All-American, the NFCA National Freshman of the Year, Softball America Freshman of the Year and a finalist for USA Softball Collegiate Player of the Year.

References 

Living people
2002 births
Oklahoma Sooners softball players
People from Papillion, Nebraska
Softball players from Nebraska